The outlying islands of Scotland are not part of the larger archipelagos and island groups of Scotland—the Hebrides, the Northern Isles or the Islands of the Forth and Clyde estuaries. None of these islands are currently inhabited and few of them ever were, although Hirta was occupied from the Neolithic age until 1930 and Stroma was permanently occupied until the 1970s and thereafter by lighthouse keepers and their families until 1996.  Several other outlying islands have lighthouses, none of which is still staffed.

In this list, an island is defined as "land that is surrounded by seawater on a daily basis, but not necessarily at all stages of the tide, excluding human devices such as bridges and causeways". A complication relating to membership of this list is that there are various descriptions of the scope of the Hebrides, the large group of islands that lie off Scotland's west coast. The Collins Encyclopedia of Scotland describes the Inner Hebrides as lying "east of The Minch", which would include any and all offshore islands. There are various islands that lie in the sea lochs such as Eilean Bàn and Eilean Donan that might not ordinarily be described as "Hebridean" but no formal definitions exist and for simplicity they are included in the List of Inner Hebrides rather than here.

Main islands

There are several small groupings of outlying islands involved. It is one of the few to hold joint status for its natural and cultural qualities. At  Stac an Armin is the highest sea stack in the British Isles and in July 1840, the last great auk seen in the British Isles was captured there.

East of St Kilda are the Flannan Isles, where all three lighthouse keepers mysteriously vanished without trace in December 1900. Further north and east are the two outliers of Sula Sgeir and North Rona, which have strong cultural links to the Outer Hebrides. It is the remotest island in the British Isles ever to have been inhabited on a long-term basis. It is also closer than any other part of Scotland to the Faroe Islands. Sule Skerry and Sule Stack lie further east and are administratively part of Orkney.

The islands of the north coast are remote from the main centres of population, although they mostly lie close to the mainland. There is a small group of larger islands near Tongue Bay, but the largest on this coast is Stroma in the Pentland Firth, between Caithness and Orkney. Innis Mhòr in the Dornoch Firth is the largest of a handful of small islets off the coast of Easter Ross. Further south are Inchcape off the coast of Angus, and Mugdrum, the only substantial island in the Firth of Tay. There is a cluster of islands in the Solway Firth that marks the south western border of Scotland, including the Islands of Fleet, in Wigtown Bay.

Most of the smaller islets that surround those in the main list are obscure and none have been permanently inhabited in modern times. Nonetheless, some have a degree of historical significance. Castle Mestag off Stroma is the ruins of a once fortified stack accessible only via a drawbridge. Some islets are identified as "storm washed", meaning that although they are partly above mean sea level, large waves wash over the top of them during storms, rendering them uninhabitable.

It is a small rocky islet in the North Atlantic which could be, in James Fisher's words, "the most isolated small rock in the oceans of the world" and which was declared part of Scotland by the Island of Rockall Act 1972. However, the legality of the claim is disputed by the Republic of Ireland, Denmark and Iceland and it is probably unenforceable in international law.

Smaller islets off the mainland

Solway Firth: Inch
North coast (from west to east): Stac an Dunain, Duslic, Stack Clò Kearvaig, An Garbh-eilean, Na Glas Leacan, Eilean Dubh, Clach Bheag na Faraid, Clach Mhòr na Faraid, Àigeach, Eilean Polsain, Boursa Island, Glas-eilean Mòr, Garbh-eilean, Wester Clett, Middle Clett, Easter Clett, Little Clett, Clett.
East coast:
 North Moray Firth (from north to south): The Knee, Stacks of Duncansby, Stack o' Brough, South Stack, The Stacks, Eilean na h-Aibhne, Three Kings.
 South Moray Firth (from west to east): Covesea Skerries, Halliman Skerries, Boar's Head Rock, West Muck, East Muck, Craigenroan, Bow Fiddle Rock, Collie Rocks, Craigandargity.
 Kinnaird Head to the Bullers of Buchan: The Ron, The Skerry, Miekle Mackie, Miekle Donnon, Little Donnon, Craig Snow, Meikle Dumeath, Little Dumeath.
 Bullers of Buchan to Girdle Ness: Dunbuy, The Donnons, Skellyis of Harrol.
 Girdle Ness to Buddon Ness: Craiglethy, Craigmaroinn, May Craig.
Other than Mugdrum in the Firth of Tay and the Islands of the Forth there are no genuine islands on the east coast of Scotland south of Buddon Ness.

Tidally exposed islets and skerries
There are various smaller islets and skerries in the seas surrounding the mainland of Scotland that are only exposed at lower stages of the tide. Craiglethy is part of the Fowlsheugh nature reserve. The Three Kings, off the coast of Easter Ross near Balintore, is also known as Creag Harail or Harold's Rock and called The King's Sons in the New Statistical Account of Scotland. According to legend, three sons of a Danish prince, sailing to avenge their sister's wrongs, were wrecked here and gave these rocks their collective name. Their graves were marked by the sculptured stones of Nigg, Shandwick and Hilton of Cadboll. Another story has their burial at Nigg Rocks below the North Sutor.

See also

List of Outer Hebrides
Inner Hebrides
 List of Orkney islands
 List of Shetland islands
 Islands of the Clyde
 Islands of the Forth
 List of islands of Scotland
 Scottish island names
 List of islands of the British Isles

References and footnotes
General references
 
 Fisher, James (1956) Rockall. London. Geoffrey Bles.
 Fleming, Andrew (2005) St Kilda and the Wider World: Tales of an Iconic Island. Windgather Press. 
 Haswell-Smith, Hamish. (2004) The Scottish Islands. Edinburgh. Canongate. 
 Keay, J. & Keay, J. (1994) Collins Encyclopaedia of Scotland. London. HarperCollins.
 
 Maclean, Charles (1977) Island on the Edge of the World: the Story of St. Kilda. Edinburgh. Canongate. 
 Nicholson, Christopher. (1995) Rock Lighthouses of Britain: The End of an Era? Caithness. Whittles. 
 Ordnance Survey (2009) "Get-a-map".  Retrieved 6–10 February 2010.
 Quine, David (2000) St Kilda. Grantown-on-Spey. Colin Baxter Island Guides. 
 Rackwitz, Martin (2007) Travels to Terra Incognita: The Scottish Highlands and Hebrides in Early Modern Travellers' Accounts C. 1600 to 1800. Waxmann Verlag. 
 Watson, William John (1976) "Place Names of Ross and Cromarty" Ross & Cromarty Heritage Society. 
Notes

Citations

Outlying
Outlying